Meyersdale Area High School is a four-year high school, located just south of Meyersdale in southcentral Somerset County in Summit Township. The original complex was opened in the late 1950s and featured modern classrooms, a gymnasium, auditorium, cafeteria, library, commercial shops and adjoining athletic fields.

Vocational Education
Students in grades 10-12 who wish to pursue training in a specific career path or field may attend the Somerset County Technology Center in Somerset Township.

Athletic Teams
Meyersdale Area participates in PIAA District V

Clubs
A List of Clubs  at the High School are as follows

 Art
 Chess
 Consumer Science
 Envirothon
 FBLA
 FFA
 French
 Modern Music
 Musical
 Raider Review
 Reading Team
 SADD
 Scholastic Quiz
 Science
 Ski
 Spanish
 STAND
 Student Council
 Tech Ed.

References

Public high schools in Pennsylvania
Schools in Somerset County, Pennsylvania
1950s establishments in Pennsylvania